KVMV (96.9 FM) is a radio station broadcasting a Christian adult contemporary format. Licensed to McAllen, Texas, United States, the station serves the McAllen area.  The station is currently owned by World Radio Network, Inc.

References

External links

Contemporary Christian radio stations in the United States
Mass media in McAllen, Texas
Radio stations established in 1970
1970 establishments in Texas
VMV